Event Two of the 2015 Monster Energy FIM Speedway World Cup was the second race of the 2015 edition of the Speedway World Cup. It was run on June 8 at the Adrian Flux Arena in King's Lynn, Great Britain and was won by Australia from hosts Great Britain, the United States, and Latvia. As a result, Australia progressed directly to the 2015 Speedway World Cup Final, while Great Britain and the United States progressed to the 2015 Speedway World Cup Race-off. Latvia were eliminated.

Australia were led to victory by Jason Doyle, and he was well supported by Nick Morris, Troy Batchelor and former world champion Chris Holder. Tai Woffinden and Chris Harris top scored for the hosts, while reigning world champion Greg Hancock starred for the United States.

Results

Scores

References 

2015 Speedway World Cup